Hutchins is a surname. Notable people with the surname include:

 Bobby "Wheezer" Hutchins (1925–1945), American actor
 Carleen Hutchins (1911–2009), American musical instrument inventor
 Carlton B. Hutchins (1904–1938), US Navy Medal of Honor awardee
 Charles P. Hutchins (1872–1938), American college sports coach
 Edward John Hutchins (1809–1876), a Liberal MP in the UK Parliament
 Edwin Hutchins (born 1948), American cognitive scientist
 Ellen Hutchins (1785–1815), Irish botanist
 Frank Avery Hutchins (1851-1914), American librarian
 Fyfe Hutchins (born 1980), aka Fyfe Dangerfield, British musician
 Halyna Hutchins (1979–2021), Ukrainian-American cinematographer
 Hazel Hutchins, Canadian children's author
 James Hutchins (disambiguation), several people
 Jessica Jackson Hutchins (born 1971), American artist
 J. C. Hutchins (born 1975), American author and podcaster
 J. Weston Hutchins (1854–1943), American politician
 Lawrence Hutchins III, United States Marine Corps infantryman involved in the Hamdania incident
 Loraine Hutchins, American feminist writer
 Marcus Hutchins (born 1994), British cybersecurity researcher
 Maude Hutchins (1899–1991), American novelist
 Meg Hutchins (born 1982), Australian rules footballer
 Mel Hutchins (1928–2018), American basketball player
 Paul Hutchins (1945–2019), British tennis player
 Robert Maynard Hutchins (1899–1977), American educational philosopher
 Robert Owen Hutchins (1939–2009), American organic chemist and educator
 Bobby Hutchins (1925–1945), American child actor
 Ross Arnold Hutchins (born 1985), British tennis player
 Scott Hutchins (born 1974), American author
 Sonny Hutchins (1929–2005), American racing driver
 Steve Hutchins (1956–2017), Australian politician
Stilson Hutchins (1838–1912) American newspaper reporter and publisher, founder of The Washington Post
 Thomas Hutchins (1730–1789), American geographer
 Thomas E. Hutchins, American politician
 Von Hutchins (born 1981), American football player
 Will Hutchins (born 1930), American actor
 William Hutchins (1792–1841), Anglican Archdeacon of Van Diemen's Land
 W. John Hutchins (1939–2021), English linguist and information scientist

See also
Hutchence, surname